Engina bonasia is a species of sea snail, a marine gastropod mollusk in the family Pisaniidae

Description

Distribution
This species occurs in the Indian Ocean off Chagos, Aldabra and the Mascarene Islands.

References

 Kilburn R.N., Marais J.P. & Fraussen K. (2010) Buccinidae. pp. 16–52, in: Marais A.P. & Seccombe A.D. (eds), Identification guide to the seashells of South Africa. Volume 1. Groenkloof: Centre for Molluscan Studies. 376 pp.

Pisaniidae
Gastropods described in 1880